The Man from Toronto may refer to:

 The Man from Toronto (1933 film), a British romantic comedy film directed by Sinclair Hill
 The Man from Toronto (2022 film), an American action comedy film directed by Patrick Hughes